Yonatan Razel is an American-Israeli singer, writer, composer, musical arranger and conductor.

Biography
Yonatan Razel was born in New York and moved to Israel at a young age with his family.

Razel is the brother of musicians Aaron Razel and Ricka Van Leeuwen, and the cousin of the violinist Nitzan Chen Razel.
As a child he learned to play on piano and cello, and studied conducting with Mendi Rodan.  With his siblings Aharon, Yehuda and Ricka, the Razels formed a band and performed on Rivka Michaeli's program.  Razel's army service was as a musician and arranger for the IDF military band.  After his release, he studied conducting and was the conductor for the Israel Chamber Orchestra and the Ra'anana Symphonette.

For a number of years Razel abandoned his music, moved to Susya, where he worked as a shepherd and studied psychology. An offer to arrange music came from Yoni Rechter and drew him back into the musical world.  This performance won warm reactions, and was later included in a "Best of.." collection by Yoni Rechter.  This was also when Razel met and befriended Evyatar Banai.

He currently lives in Nachlaot, Jerusalem, is married to Yael and has three daughters and one son.

He learns in the Jerusalem Kollel under the direction of Rabbi Yitzchak Berkovits.

Musical career
In 2007, after 12 years of work, Razel released his first album, All in All, produced by Eviatar Banai.  Three radio singles from the album were "All in all", "Zion", and "I am my prayer".  The album was followed by a solo tour.

Razel won "Singer of the Year" and "Song of the Year" from Ynet in the fall of 2007.

In 2009, Razel gained fame in the Orthodox Jewish community after a song he wrote and arranged for Yaakov Shwekey, "Vehi Sheamda", was successful and won an award as "Song of the Decade" from the religious Israeli radio station "Kol Chai".

In 2022, he came to Strasbourg, France after befriending with the Amira community during their trip together to Uman. He played in the 'grande shule' and Strasbourg's youth accompanied him with music and joy till his car. During the concert, he sang, and the Bas Rhin's Chief Rabbi Harold Avraham Weill joined him on his saxophone. It was "the best evening  he had in a long time". All the jews of Strasbourg loved him.

Discography 
All in All (2007)
In Between the Sounds (2012)
Open To Change (2017)
Live at Heichal HaTarbut (2018)

See also 
 Aaron Razel
 Music of Israel

References

Israeli musicians
Jewish American songwriters
Jewish American musicians
Living people
Baalei teshuva
American Orthodox Jews
American emigrants to Israel
Israeli Orthodox Jews
Musicians from New York City
People from Jerusalem
Songwriters from New York (state)
1973 births
21st-century American Jews